This is a list of notable environmental lawyers.

References

Law-related lists
 
Lawyers by type
Lawyers
Lists of legal professionals